Norway Baldwin Jackes (June 8, 1881 – July 8, 1964) was a Canadian rower who competed in the 1908 Summer Olympics. He was the strokeman of the Canadian boat, which won the bronze medal in the coxless pair.

He went on to become a Canadian soldier in the First World War. He later lived in Port Hope, Ontario where he died in 1964.

References

External links
profile

1881 births
1964 deaths
Canadian male rowers
Olympic rowers of Canada
Rowers at the 1908 Summer Olympics
Olympic bronze medalists for Canada
Olympic medalists in rowing
Canadian military personnel of World War I
Medalists at the 1908 Summer Olympics
20th-century Canadian people